Kingston Armory is a historic National Guard armory located at Kingston, Luzerne County, Pennsylvania.

History
It was built in 1923, and is a three-story, "U"-shaped yellow brick building executed in the Classical Revival style. It is 13 bays by 20 bays, and includes a drill hall, classrooms, offices, storage, and stable areas.

On 11 September 1950, 33 guardsmen from the 109th Field Artillery Regiment were killed in a train accident near Coshocton, Ohio. In the following days, the dead were moved to the Kingston Armory. Once there, the 109th Field Artillery Battalion relinquished the remains of their fellow soldiers to the grief-stricken families.

It was added to the National Register of Historic Places in 1989.

The Armory has been and——continues to be used as a venue for a variety of events, including concerts, Irem Shrine Circuses, the annual Luzerne County Folk Festival, and specialty shows.
mm
Concerts included Simon & Garfunkel (April 1967) and Jefferson Airplane (November 1970). Source: Wilkes-Barre Times Leader.

Gallery

References

Armories on the National Register of Historic Places in Pennsylvania
Neoclassical architecture in Pennsylvania
Infrastructure completed in 1923
Buildings and structures in Luzerne County, Pennsylvania
National Register of Historic Places in Luzerne County, Pennsylvania